Waikhom Gojen Meitei is an Indian poet and educationist from Manipur. The Government of India honored him in 2014 by bestowing upon him the Padma Shri, the fourth highest civilian award, for his services to the fields of education and literature.

Biography
Waikhom Gojen Meitei was born in Manipur. He is the Secretary of Meetei Erol Eyek Loinasillon Apunba Manipur (MEELAL). His contributions to the revival of Meitei indigenous script is notable.

Meitei lives in New Delhi at Ambedkar Bhawan. He is also a recipient of the title, Babu Jagat Jiban by Ram Lala Sanskriti Sahitya Academy in January 2002 and has also won Special Jury prize at the Second Sahitya Seva Samiti Manipuri Film Awards 2013, for his song Eeyekna Eepani Eerolna Eemani for the film, Eikhoibusu Hinghanbiyu in 2013.

References

External links
 
 
 

Living people
Recipients of the Padma Shri in literature & education
Meitei poets
Poets from Manipur
20th-century Indian poets
Year of birth missing (living people)